Rustom Sohrab Rustomji (30 August 1917 – ) was a Pakistani architect.

Life and career

Early life
Rustomji was born in Karachi on 30 August 1917.

Institute of Architects, Pakistan
In the 1950s, he along with 10 other practising architects including two foreigners; M. A. Ahed, Tajuddin Bhamani, Minoo Mistry, Pir Mohammad, Abdulhusein M. Thariani, H. H. Khan, Mehdi Ali Mirza, Zahiruddn Khawaja, Bloomfield and Peter Powell, formed the Institute of Architects, Pakistan. He signed the Institute's Memorandum of Association.

Before 1947
In late 1943, he became the  state architect of Bikaner.

After 1947
In 1947, after independence was announced, he was offered a partnership in the firm, D.H. Daruvala & Co in Karachi and moved back to the city. He remained with the firm thereafter.

Rustomji died around 2016.

List of Projects

References

1917 births
2010s deaths
Year of death uncertain
Indian architects
Pakistani architects
Parsi people
People from Karachi